Disney Magicboard Online (迪士尼魔幻飞板) is a racing online game featuring Disney characters. This online game was released only in China on December 10, 2007. It was developed by the Chinese game developer Shanda under license of The Walt Disney Company.

Gameplay
Players can control the magicboard by using the arrow keys on the keyboard. They can choose only one character. After they choose, it cannot change back.

Playable characters
 Mickey Mouse
 Minnie Mouse
 Goofy
 Donald Duck
 Daisy Duck
 Pluto

References

External links
 Official game site via Internet Archive (August 17th, 2007) 

2007 video games
China-exclusive video games
Massively multiplayer online role-playing games
Mickey Mouse video games
Donald Duck video games
Goofy (Disney) video games
Video games developed in China
Windows games
Windows-only games